Shuangmiao Township is a township of Zhangwu County in northern Liaoning province, China, located about  west of the county seat and  northeast of downtown Fuxin. , it has 7 villages under its administration.

See also 
 List of township-level divisions of Liaoning

References 

Township-level divisions of Liaoning